Anirudha Sinha (born 5 November 1904, date of death unknown) was an Indian politician belonging to the Indian National Congress. He was elected to the lower House of the Indian Parliament the Lok Sabha from Madhubani  in Bihar.

References

External links
Official biographical sketch in Parliament of India website

1904 births
Year of death missing
India MPs 1952–1957
India MPs 1957–1962
Indian National Congress politicians
Lok Sabha members from Bihar